Minilimosina is a subgenus of flies belonging to the family Lesser Dung flies.

Species
M. accinta Marshall, 1985
M. baculum Marshall, 1985
M. bicuspis Roháček, 1993
M. caelator Roháček, 1988
M. curvispina Carles-Tolrá, 2001
M. fungicola (Haliday, 1836)
M. gemella Roháček, 1983
M. hispidula Roháček, 1988
M. intermedia Marshall, 1985
M. knightae (Harrison, 1959)
M. kozaneki (Kuznetzova, 1991)
M. lepida Marshall, 1985
M. longisternum Marshall, 1985
M. meszarosi (Papp, 1974)
M. microtophila (Papp, 1973)
M. nasuta (Spuler, 1925)
M. parafungicola (Papp, 1974)
M. parva (Malloch, 1913)
M. parvula (Stenhammar, 1855)
M. pulpa Marshall, 1985
M. rohaceki (Papp, 1978)
M. sclerophallus Marshall, 1985
M. similissima (Papp, 1974)
M. sitka Marshall in Marshall & Winchester, 1999
M. tenera Roháček, 1983
M. trogeri Roháček, 1983
M. tuberculum Marshall, 1985
M. zeda Marshall, 1985

References

Sphaeroceridae
Diptera of North America
Diptera of South America
Diptera of Europe
Diptera of Asia
Diptera of Australasia
Insect subgenera